Henry Mountain is a high and prominent mountain summit in the southern Sawatch Range of the Rocky Mountains of North America.

Mountain

See also

List of mountain peaks of North America
List of mountain peaks of the United States
List of mountain peaks of Colorado

References

External links

 

Mountains of Colorado
Mountains of Gunnison County, Colorado
Gunnison National Forest
North American 4000 m summits